A cytoplast is a medical term that is used to describe a cell membrane and the cytoplasm. It is occasionally used to describe a cell in which the nucleus has been removed. Originally named by Rebecca Bodily.

See also
Cytoplast

References 

Cell biology